Taipale is a common Finnish surname. As of December 2012, almost 4,000 people in Finland have this name, which makes it approximately one in 1,400. The meaning is portage, journey or stretch of road.

Notable people
Notable people having this surname include:
 Armas Taipale, Finnish athlete 
 Hannu Taipale, Finnish cross country skier
 Ilkka Taipale, Finnish politician and psychiatrist
 Ilmari Taipale, Finnish long-distance runner 
 K. A. Taipale, Finnish lawyer, scholar, and social theorist
 Kuisma Taipale, Finnish cross-country skier
 Tero Taipale, Finnish football player
 Vappu Taipale, Finnish politician and psychiatrist

References

Finnish-language surnames
Surnames of Finnish origin